Hastings Edward Harington VC (9 November 1832 – 20 July 1861) was an English recipient of the Victoria Cross, the highest and most prestigious award for gallantry in the face of the enemy that can be awarded to British and Commonwealth forces.

Background
Harington was born in St Peter Port, Guensey in 1832 and educated at Reading School.

Military career
Harington's military career began on 12 June 1852, when he was commissioned as a 2nd Lieutenant in the Bengal Artillery. During the Indian Mutiny he was severely wounded at Trimmoo Ghat. He was present throughout the Siege of Delhi, and after the fall of the city he proceeded with the Grethed's column towards Cawnpore taking an active part in the engagements at Maligurh Fort, Allygurh and Agra. He was present at the relief of the garrison at Lucknow, where his courage gained him the Victoria Cross, for which he was elected by the vote of his fellow officers. During these operations he was most dangerously wounded.

He was afterwards present at the siege and capture of Lucknow and joined in the pursuit of the rebels towards Rohileund until he was severely wounded at Rooyah. This last wound compelled him to go to the Himalayas to recover his health; but deriving only temporary relief and still being troubled by a bullet which remained in his back, he was obliged to return to England and after undergoing a painful operation the bullet was extracted. His health being partially restored he returned to his duty in October 1860. Shortly after his arrival in India he proceeded on service with the Sikkim Field Force and was afterwards appointed adjutant 6th Battalion Bengal Artillery at Agra where he died from cholera on 20 July 1861, having achieved the rank of captain.

The Victoria Cross 
Harington was 25 years old, and a Lieutenant in the Bengal Artillery, Indian Army during the Indian Mutiny when the following deeds took place at the Relief of Lucknow for which he was awarded the VC, the citation reading as follows:

References

1832 births
1861 deaths
British Indian Army officers
British recipients of the Victoria Cross
Indian Rebellion of 1857 recipients of the Victoria Cross
People from Wiltshire
People educated at Reading School
Deaths from cholera
Infectious disease deaths in India
Bengal Artillery officers